Gen.G (also called Gen.G Esports), previously known as KSV Esports, is a professional esports organization with headquarters in Santa Monica, Seoul, and Shanghai. According to Forbes, Gen.G is the sixth most valuable esports organization in the world as of December 2020, worth US$185 million.

History 
Gen.G Esports was formed in 2017 as KSV eSports by Kevin Chou and Kent Wakeford, co-founders of the video game development company Kabam. The organization started out by acquiring the rights for an Overwatch League franchise in Seoul, South Korea. The purchase reportedly amounted to $20 million with the intention to hire both an all-Korean roster as well as an all-Korean management staff. This team would later be known as the Seoul Dynasty. On May 3, 2018, KSV eSports announced a rebranding to Gen.G. On January 20, 2020, Gen.G was unveiled to be behind an NBA 2K League franchise called the "Gen.G Tigers of Shanghai", the first franchise to not be affiliated with an NBA team, and the first franchise outside of North America. Along with the announcement, Gen.G announced that itself and the NBA 2K League were working together in a "long-term strategic relationship". On August 27, 2020, Gen.G was announced as one of the 10 selected teams as part of League of Legends Champions Korea (LCK) franchising. On September 21, 2022, Gen.G was announced as one of the 10 teams competing in the inaugural season of the  VCT Pacifics league.

Current divisions

League of Legends 
The KSV League of Legends team was formed on November 30, 2017, with the acquisition of Samsung's esports division, which included the 2017 World Champions Samsung Galaxy roster. The team, now named Gen.G Esports, would qualify for the 2018 League of Legends World Championship, but would end up being knocked out promptly in the group stage, with a 1–5 record, in a year with a particularly bad showing from the South Korean teams. Due to missing out on the 2019 World Championship, the team's next appearance on the world stage would be at the 2020 World Championship. Gen.G would make it to the quarterfinals of the 2020 World Championship before being eliminated by G2 Esports. Gen.G made it to the semifinals of the 2021 World Championship, but they were eliminated by Edward Gaming, which went on to become that year's world champions. 

During the 2022 LCK Summer Split, Gen.G won their first LCK championship, defeating T1 in the final 3-0 to qualify as the first seed for the 2022 World Championship. At Worlds, Gen.G grouped up against 100 Thieves, CTBC Flying Oyster, and Royal Never Give Up. After finishing first, they were placed against the 3rd Korean seed DWG KIA in the quarter finals, who they beat in a 3–2 series. In the semi-finals, Gen.G faced DRX, the 4th seeded team from Korea and lost the series 1–3.

Roster

Challengers

NBA 2K 
On September 26, 2019, the NBA 2K League today announced that Gen.G Esports would launch an NBA 2K League team from Shanghai that will join the other 22 NBA 2K League teams for the 2020 season. Gen.G Tigers of Shanghai was the first NBA 2K League team outside of North America.

Overwatch 
Gen.G Esports' start came with the acquisition of an Overwatch League franchise spot, naming the team the Seoul Dynasty. In the leadup to this announcement, KSV eSports acquired the roster of Lunatic-Hai, on August 21, 2017.

Roster

PUBG: Battlegrounds 
On November 7, 2017, KSV announced its entrance into the PUBG scene, with the team KSV Asel. Just a few weeks later, on December 7, 2017, KSV added a second team for PUBG, KSV Notitle aka KSV NTT. On August 16, 2018, Gen.G announced the merging of the two teams. The resulting team has proved very successful over the years, winning the first PUBG World Championship - PUBG Global Invitational 2018, the 2019 Global Championship, and placing third at the 2021 PUBG Global Invitational.

Roster

Rocket League 
On September 28th 2022, Gen.G Mobil1 Racing was formed as a result of a partnership between Gen.G Esports and Mobil 1. 
ApparentlyJack, Chronic and noly joined the starting roster, with Pollo as substitute. Allushin joined as coach on the 30th.

Roster

Valorant 
On May 4 entered Valorant with the acquisition of FRENCH CANADIANS. Gen.G would win the first major North American VALORANT, T1 x Nerd Street Gamers Invitational. Gen.G would go on to win an additional 3 tournaments in 2020 - Pittsburgh Knights Tournament Series, Pulse Invitational, and Pittsburgh Knights Before Christmas. After the announcement of the Valorant Franchisement League, Gen.G has decided to base its roster in Korea.

Roster

Former division

Heroes of the Storm 
On October 24, 2017, it was announced that KSV acquired the rosters of two South Korean Heroes of the Storm (HOTS) teams - MVP Black and MVP Miracle. On November 28, KSV announced it had to drop the now KSV Miracle roster, due to restrictions from Blizzard. KSV Black/Gen.G roster would go on to win 3 Global Championships (2017 HOTS Global Championship, 2018 HOTS Global Championship Mid-Season Brawl, 2018 HOTS Global Championship) before Blizzard ended HOTS esports in December 2018.

Clash Royale 
On February 26, 2018, Gen.G announce the founding of the Clash Royale division in the Clash Royale League China with Cheshen, D.King, XiaoK, Little Chen and Winds. Gen.G Esports withdrew from the Clash Royale League on November 4, 2019.

Fortnite 
On October 25, 2018, Gen.G entered Fortnite by signing an all-female Fortnite team, TINARAES, and maddiesuun. In August 2019, Gen.G partnered with dating app Bumble to create an all-female Fortnite team known as "Gen.G Team Bumble".

TINARAES would become the first female Fortnite player to win a major competitive Fortnite even in 'Twitch Rivals: TwitchCon Fortnite Showdown' with Rhux and Pika. Gen.G would also sign 14 years old, Moqii, who would become the first female Fortnite pro to win a major Epic hosted solo Fortnite event 'European Fortnite Champion Series (FNCS) qualifier'.

Call of Duty: Black Ops 4 
On January 31, 2019, Gen.G Esports enter Call of Duty with the signing of Team Space featuring Spacely, Maux, MajorManiak, Nagafen, Havok, and Nubzy as coach. Gen.G would also bring on Envoy before CWL Fort Worth 2019. Gen.G would finish CWL Anaheim 2019 in 2nd place  and finish 2019 CWL Pro League in 2nd place. Gen.G would then be eliminated in last place in the Call of Duty Championship 2019. Shortly after the CWL Championship 2019 Gen.G released all of their players since Gen.G would not be participating in the new Call of Duty League.

Apex Legends 
On March 1, 2019, Gen.G Esports entered the Competitive Apex Legends by signing GrimReality, dummy, and silkthread. On November 19, 2019, Gen.G released its Apex Legends roster due to poor performance.

Counter-Strike: Global Offensive 
On December 6, 2019, Gen.G signed the former core of Cloud9 along with the team's assistant coach. Boston Major winner, Timothy "autimatic" Ta was signed, along with Kenneth "koosta" Suen, Damian "daps" Steele, and Chris "Elmapuddy" Tebbit as head coach. Three days later, Gen.G signed Sam "s0m" Oh after he was released from Team Envy. Hunter "SicK" Mims was also announced as a stand-in for the IEM Katowice 2020 qualifiers until the final slot was filled. On December 22, Gen.G announced the signing Hansel "BnTeT" Ferdinand from top Chinese team TyLoo to finalize the roster. Gen.G won the only in-person LAN in 2020 (due to COVID-19 pandemic), DreamHack Open Anaheim 2020, without dropping a map and currently remaining undefeated on LAN. Gen.G would also win 2020 ESL One: Road to Rio - North America. The roster was subsequently disbanded in February 2021, when its last member, Timothy "autimatic" Ta, was acquired by T1 in VALORANT.

Championships

References 

League of Legends Champions Korea teams
Overwatch League academy teams
Call of Duty teams
Heroes of the Storm teams
PlayerUnknown's Battlegrounds teams
Esports teams based in South Korea
Esports teams based in the United States
Esports teams based in Los Angeles
Esports teams based in China
Esports teams established in 2017
Seoul Dynasty
Valorant teams